{|
{{Infobox ship image
|Ship image= IJN escort vessel SHONAN in 1944.jpg
|Ship image size = 300px
|Ship caption= Daitō or Shōnan<ref>The vessel on the photograph has been identified as two different vessels.First option: Daitō in August 1944, by Ships of the World special issue Vol.45, Escort Vessels of the Imperial Japanese Navy.Second option: Shōnan in July 1944, by the Yamato Museum.</ref>
}}

{{Infobox ship characteristics
|Hide header=
|Header caption=
|Ship class=
|Ship type=Escort ship
|Ship displacement=  standard
|Ship length=  overall
|Ship beam= 
|Ship height=
|Ship draught= 
|Ship draft= 
|Ship propulsion=*2 × Kampon Mk.22 Model 10 diesels
2 shafts, 
|Ship power= 
|Ship speed=
|Ship range= at 
|Ship complement=150
|Ship EW=
|Ship armament=*Hiburi, June 19443 ×  L/45 AA guns
6 × Type 96 25 mm AA guns
120 × Type 95 depth charges
2 × Type 94 depth charge projectors
2 × depth charge throwers
1 × 22-Gō surface search radar
1 × Type 93 active sonar
1 × Type 93 hydrophone
2 × ParavanesShisaka, 19453 ×  L/45 AA guns
16 × Type 96 Type 96  AA guns
120 × Type 2 depth charges
3 × Type 94 depth charge projectors
2 × depth charge throwers
1 × Type 3 81 mm mortar
1 × 22-Gō surface search radar
1 × 13-Gō early warning radar
2 × Type 3 active sonars
1 × Type 93 hydrophone
|Ship armour=
}}
|}

The {{nihongo|Hiburi-class escort ship|日振型海防艦,|Hiburi-gata Kaibōkan}} was a sub-class of the s of the Imperial Japanese Navy (IJN), serving during and after World War II.

 Background 
In the Rapid Naval Armaments Supplement Programme of 1941, the Imperial Japanese Navy ordered the construction of thirty escort vessels (kaibōkan) – designated as #310 to #339 of that Programme, to provide escort ships for the Navy. However, three of the Mikura class (ships #328, #333 and #339) were subsequently designated as to be built to the Hiburi design.

In the next year's Modified 5th Naval Armaments Supplement Programme, the IJN ordered the construction of another thirty-four ships to a modified version of the Type-B design; these were designated as #5251 to #5284 of that Programme. However, eight of these ship (ships #5252, #5254, #5257, ##5259 and #5263 to #5266) were subsequently designated to be built to the Hiburi design. Only six of the eight were so completed, with #5265 and #5266 being incomplete at the end of the Pacific War and broken up.

The eleven ships were all ordered from the Hitachi Zōsen shipbuilding concern at Sakurajima, which had also received other orders for ships completed to the Etorofu, Mikura and Ukuru designs. The Hiburi design used the same hull as the Ukuru class, but with different fittings. However, the Navy General Staff also noted that too many man-hours of work were needed for their building.

Design 
 The Navy Technical Department (Kampon) used the Ukuru'''s basic designs for the new drawings. It was a chimera of Mikura and Ukuru classes.
 The new drawings had the following characteristic.
 Armaments and under waterline designs were same as Mikura.
 Everything else was same as in the Ukuru.
 The Kampon estimated man-hours for building will be between 42,000 to 40,000.
 The new drawing was sent to the Hitachi Zōsen Corporation, Sakurajima Shipyard. Those ships of the Mikura class and the Ukuru class that had not been started were converted to the Hiburi class. The Hitachi Zōsen built all of the Hiburi class vessels.

 Ships in class 
Of the nine ships completed, three were sunk by US submarines and two by naval mines.

 Appendix 
Classification of the Kaibōkan classes in IJN official documents
The Shimushu, Etorofu, Mikura, Hiburi and Ukuru were classed in the Shimushu class.
The IJN changed their classification on 5 June 1944, because the shipyards and commanders were confused.
The Escort ship Type-B and Modified Type-B were combined to the Escort ship Type-A, and Type-Bs became extinct thereby.

 Photos 
(changes of the equipments, and under waterline designs)

 See also 
Shimushu-class escort ship
Etorofu-class escort ship
Mikura-class escort ship
Ukuru-class escort ship
Type C escort ship
Type D escort ship
Destroyer escort
Tacoma-class frigate
Flower-class corvette

 Footnotes 

 Bibliography , History of Pacific War Vol.51, The truth histories of the Imperial Japanese Vessels Part.2, Gakken (Japan), June 2002, Ships of the World special issue Vol.45, Escort Vessels of the Imperial Japanese Navy, (Japan), February 1996Model Art Extra No.340, Drawings of Imperial Japanese Naval Vessels Part-1,  (Japan), October 1989The Maru Special, Japanese Naval Vessels No.28, Japanese escort ships'',  (Japan), June 1979

Escort ship classes
World War II naval ships of Japan
Ships built by Hitachi Zosen Corporation
Ships of the Republic of China Navy
Ships of the People's Liberation Army Navy